Charles A. Peterson (April 12, 1884 – August 14, 1953) was a member of the Wisconsin State Assembly.

Peterson was born in Harris, Minnesota. He was elected as a Republican in 1948. Peterson went to the college of agriculture at University of Wisconsin and was a farmer. He served as town chairman and also served on the Fond du Lac County, Wisconsin Board of Supervisors. He died while still in office. He lived in Rosendale, Wisconsin.

References

People from Harris, Minnesota
People from Rosendale, Wisconsin
University of Wisconsin–Madison College of Agricultural and Life Sciences alumni
Farmers from Wisconsin
Mayors of places in Wisconsin
County supervisors in Wisconsin
Republican Party members of the Wisconsin State Assembly
1884 births
1953 deaths
20th-century American politicians